Kosasthalaiyar River, also known as Kortalaiyar, is one of the three rivers that flow in the Chennai metropolitan area.

The river and its course
Its northern tributary Nagari river originates in Chitoor district of Andhra Pradesh and joins the main river in the backwaters of Poondi reservoir. Its catchment area is spread over Vellore, Chitoor, North Arcot, Thiruvallur and Chennai districts. It has a catchment area in North Arcot District where it branches near Kesavaram Anicut and this tributary flows to the Chennai city as Cooum River, while the main river flows to the Poondi reservoir. From Poondi reservoir, the river flows through Thiruvallur District, enters the Chennai metropolitan area, and joins the sea at Ennore Creek. The river has 9 check dams. There are two check dams across the river at Tamaraipakkam and Vallur. The excess discharge in the river is controlled by the Tamarapakkam Anicut located across the river in the downstream of Poondi reservoir. Vallur Anicut is a small check dam constructed near Minjur across the river to control water levels and feed irrigation channels in the area.

Galeru Nagari irrigation project is under execution to supply Krishna river water from Srisailam reservoir in Nagari basin of Chitoor district.

Every year, whenever the floodgates of Poondi reservoir are opened, a considerable volume of water gets drained into the sea through the Kosasthalaiyar River near the Ennore Creek.

Work on 10th check dam across the river is expected to by completed by the end of 2018 at a cost of  70 million. The structure would be 1.5 meters high, built across the 100-meter wide river. It would store water in the river for over 2 kilometers.

Channels
The historic Korattur anicut located at Jamin Korattur in Tiruvallur district serves as a vital channel to regulating water to the Chembarambakkam reservoir. The dam was built in 1876 across the unpolluted stretch of the Cooum river and diverts excess water to the Chembarambakkam reservoir.

Restoration
In 2011, the Water Resources Department (WRD) initiated the tendering process under the Irrigated Agriculture Modernisation and Waterbodies Restoration and Management (IAMWARM) project to rejuvenate nearly 200 lakes falling under Kosasthalaiyar river sub-basin. The department also proposes to construct groynes to reduce formation of sand bars near the mouth the river.

In 2018, two more check-dams were planned across the river. One of them will be located between Pudhukuppam and Kudiraipallam, downstream of Karanodai bridge. The dam will be built to a height of 1.2 meters across the river and the width will be nearly 335 meters, at a cost of  99 million. This will be the eighth check-dam built across the river. Another one will be built in Bandikavanur, about 30 km from Chennai. This will help recharge groundwater in a radius of 10 km.

See also
 Cooum river
 Adyar river
 Water management in Chennai

References

Geography of Chennai
Rivers of Tamil Nadu
Rivers of India